St. Nicholas Catholic Church may refer to:

 St. Nicholas Catholic Church (Passaic, New Jersey)
 St. Nicholas Catholic Church (Osgood, Ohio)
 St. Nicholas Catholic Church (Zanesville, Ohio)